Neemia Stanley Tialata (born 15 July 1982 in Lower Hutt, New Zealand) is a New Zealand rugby union footballer. He currently plays for Stade Toulousain in the Top 14. As well as representing New Zealand from 2005 - 2010, he also played for the Hurricanes in Super Rugby and for Wellington in the ITM/Air New Zealand Cup when available.

Early life

Tialata was born in Lower Hutt but moved, when he was one, to American Samoa with his parents who were undergoing religious training in Kanana Fou Theological Seminary. The family returned to their vocation in New Zealand when Tialata was five with his late mother Sipoutasi, late father Rev. Pelema and sisters. He was the only boy and was the third child out of the four.

His father died after a year of serving at the CCCAS church in Porirua, New Zealand followed by his mother four years after. Tialata and his three sisters now reside with his aunt whom he now calls his mother (Nu'ulopa) and her five children whom Tialata also now considers his brothers and sisters.

Career
Tialata debuted for Wellington in 2003 and was selected for the Hurricanes in 2004. Tialata thrust himself into the All Blacks selection frame as a young prop with his strong play throughout the 2005 season and made his Test debut in the first match of the All Blacks Home Nations tour – against Wales – in November that year. He was dropped from the 2010 Tri Nations squad due to poor form. In 2011, after 8 seasons with the Hurricanes, he signed with Top 14 side Aviron Bayonnais. Formerly a loosehead prop, Tialata now concentrates his efforts on the tighthead side of the scrum but retains the valuable ability to cover both sides

References

External links
 
 

1982 births
New Zealand Christians
New Zealand sportspeople of Samoan descent
New Zealand international rugby union players
People educated at Wellington College (New Zealand)
Living people
New Zealand rugby union players
Rugby union players from Lower Hutt
Rugby union props
Wainuiomata Lions players
Wellington rugby union players
Hurricanes (rugby union) players
Aviron Bayonnais players
Stade Toulousain players
New Zealand expatriate rugby union players
New Zealand expatriate sportspeople in France
Expatriate rugby union players in France
People educated at Wainuiomata High School